Sarkadtanya (formerly Sarkad) is a populated place, now part of Tiszalúc, in the county of Borsod-Abaúj-Zemplén, Hungary.

References

Populated places in Borsod-Abaúj-Zemplén County